Tanghetto is an Argentinian neotango and electronic tango music project created and led by musician and producer Max Masri. Winner of the Gardel Award and four times nominated to the Latin Grammy Awards. It's based in Buenos Aires, Argentina.

The style of Tanghetto is a blend of tango and electronic music and is also influenced by world music and jazz. The main feature of their music, apart from the balance of electronic and ethnic sounds, is the strong presence of melody and song structure.  Tanghetto uses technology as another musical instrument.

History 
Tanghetto released their first album, Emigrante (electrotango) in 2003. It was inspired in the economic crisis that Argentina was facing back in 2001 and also in the feelings of distress generated by the massive exile of many young Argentines, that decided to flee from their country, in a desperate move to find a future. ¨Emigrante¨ was nominated for the Latin Grammy Awards of 2004 in the category of "Best Instrumental", and later reached platinum status in Argentina in 2006 and double platinum in 2009. According to The Los Angeles Times, Tanghetto is the most seductive electrotango band that is based in Buenos Aires and the album "Emigrante" is "marked by its languid melodies, its smoky textures and the kind of delicate piano lines that would make Massive Attack proud". They presented the album in many different venues in Buenos Aires and as a part of the Festival y Mundial de Tango, and also at he most iconic place in Buenos Aires, their show at the Obelisco. In Dicember 2004 the group released an album from a side project called Hybrid Tango, in which a variety of world music styles are blended with their unique sound, including flamenco, candombe, and jazz. This album was also nominated for the Latin Grammy Awards of 2005 in the Traditional/ Best Tango Category.

In October 2005 a new album, Buenos Aires Remixed, was released. It's an album that contains 12 remixed versions of Tanghetto songs plus two cover songs (Enjoy the Silence, from Depeche Mode and New Order's Blue Monday). Their version of "Blue Monday" became an alternative radio hit in the US, and a favorite on KCRW radio station in Los Angeles. Buenos Aires Remixed reached gold status in early 2007 and became their second platinum album later that year. In 2005 they released their first controversial video "Tangocrisis", with images of the Argentine economic crisis. Their second video from ¨Hybrid Tango¨, "Barrio Sur" was their first video with rotation on MTV. In July 2006 they released their first DVD, "Live in Buenos Aires".

After consistently touring through Europe and the Americas, the band recorded their next studio album, called El Miedo a la Libertad, named after Erich Fromm's classic essay, Fear of Freedom. The album was released on March 1, 2008, and in July 2009 it won a Gardel Award, the Argentine equivalent of the Grammy.

In late 2009 after their first big tour in Brazil, they released a new studio album called Más Allá del Sur which was also nominated for a Carlos Gardel Award, this time in 2010. In 2011 they released their album VIVO (live around the world) which was recorded during their last two tours. The album also includes a cover version of "Seven Nation Army" from The White Stripes and an electrotango version of the song "Computer Love" by German electro pioneers Kraftwerk. There's a second volume for the "VIVO" album dubbed "VIVO 'Milonguero'" with 14 live tracks, including unplugged versions recorded during the 2007 BBC Sessions and some bonus tracks, such as Piazzolla's "Allegro Tangabile". This album features a notable live version of "Libertango" also by the great tango creator Astor Piazzolla. ¨VIVO Milonguero¨ won their second Gardel Award. In late 2012 a concept album called Incidental Tango was released, with the participation of guest arranger / pianist Aldo Di Paolo. For the ¨Incidental Tango¨ album, Masri envisioned the notion that music is always the soundtrack of everyone's life, and thus Tango in all of its forms is the 'incidental music' of life in Buenos Aires. Tanghetto toured all over Europe in 2013, playing in one of the most important venues in London, The O2 Arena, and toured Romania and Poland for the first time. They also toured in Latin America, in Mexico, Uruguay, Chile, Brazil, Argentina. In 2014 they released the follow up to their 2004 concept album ¨Hybrid Tango¨, named ¨Hybrid Tango II¨. The album consisted of new recorded material and some songs that were not used in other albums but were of excellent artistic quality and were kept for this project. In September 2014 Tanghetto was nominated for the third time to the Latin Grammy's with ¨Hybrid Tango II¨ competing with Ruben Blades who won. In 2015 they released the album "Progressive Tango" and got their 6th nomination to the Gardel Awards. ¨Progressive Tango¨, first promo single became the number one song played from Tanghetto in Spotify. With that tour they played in Europe, America and Asia. In 2016 they released the album "Desenchufado", it was also nominated to the Gardel Awards becoming their 7th nomination to the most prestigious awards in Argentina in 2017. In 2018 they released the album "Vivo en Buenos Aires" recorded at some of the most important music halls of Buenos Aires and it features two new songs. In July 2018 they played for the first time at the iconic Lincoln Center in New York City for 3,000 people. In 2019 they performed their most important show in Buenos Aires celebrating 15 years of the "Emigrante" Album, playing at the Ballena Azul Symphony Hall, with three Argentine music legends as special guests: Pedro Aznar, Sandra Mihanovich and Nito Mestre. 
In early 2020 they played in Buenos Aires's iconic tango venues the Torcuato Tasso, La Viruta and Salon Canning, and after that (because of the Pandemic) they only did virtual or "from home" concerts and some TV specials. Also in 2020 they released their 8th studio album "Reinventango" that was nominated to the Gardel Awards 2021 in the category "Best Tango Orchestra", an historic achievement for an electroango band. In May 2021 they released the album "Tanghetto plays Piazzolla" as a tribute to the legendary Argentine musician Astor Piazzolla and it gets nominated to the Latin Grammys of the same year. According to Grammy.com (the ofical site of The Grammys) Tanghetto's Reinventango presents a rugged masterpiece of melancholy melodies and sharp beats. Relentless in the purity of its vision, it sets a gold standard for all tango records to follow.

Current live lineup 

Max Masri: synthesizers and programming, vocal
Antonio Boyadjian, piano
Daniel Corrado, drums
Octavio Bianchi, violin
Joaquín Benitez, bandoneon
Aldo Di Paolo, acoustic and electric piano
Regina Manfredi, Chelo

Other guest musicians 
Chao Xu: violoncello and erhu
Alessio Santoro: acoustic/electronic drums and percussion
Leandro Ragusa: bandoneon
Matías Rubino: bandoneon
Martín Cecconi: bandoneon
Diego Velázquez: guitars, requinto, backing vocals
Nicolás Tognola: bandoneon
Federico Vazquez: Bandoneon

Discography 

Studio Albums

2003: Emigrante (electrotango) (studio album)
2004: Hybrid Tango (studio album/side project)
2008: El Miedo a la Libertad (studio album)
2009: Más Allá del Sur (studio album)
2012: Incidental Tango (studio album)
2014: Hybrid Tango II (studio album)
2015: Progressive Tango (studio album)
2020; Reinventango (studio album)
2021; Tanghetto plays Piazzolla (studio album)

Live Albums, Remixes, Special Editions

2005: Buenos Aires Remixed (twelve remixes & two covers)
2010: VIVO (live album - includes a 3-track bonus studio EP)
2011: VIVO Milonguero (Second volume of VIVO, 14 new live tracks plus a 3-track bonus studio EP)
2016; Desenchufado (live in the studio album)

Singles (Promo or digital)

2003: Inmigrante 
2004: Una Llamada 
2004: Más de lo Mismo 
2005: Alexanderplatz Tango 
2005: Enjoy The Silence 
2006: Barrio Sur 
2006: El Boulevard 
2007: Blue Monday 
2007: Mente Frágil 
2008: Buscando Camorra
2008: Tangocrisis 
2008: Englishman in New York 
2009: La Milonga 
2010: Tango Místico 
2011: Buscando Camorra Live 
2012: Yumbera 
2013: Gallo Ciego (single)
2014: Quién me quita lo bailado 
2015: ¿Cuánto Más?
2016: Progressive Tango
2018: Cono Sur
2021: Transtango

Videography

Awards 

Tanghetto was nominated to the Latin Grammy Awards for the first time in 2004 in the "Best Instrumental Album" category with their album "Emigrante (electrotango)". As of January 2022 every studio album released by the band has received an Award or a nomination. In 2009 they won their first Gardel Award (Argentine Grammy) with their album El Miedo a la Libertad. They competed with top artists like Yo Yo Ma, Ruben Blades and Pablo Ziegler. In 2021 Tanghetto was nominated for "Best Tango Orchestra" for the Gardel Awards, the first time an electrotango band is nominated in what used to be an "only for traditional tango" category. Also in 2021 Tanghetto was nominated for the fourth time to the Latin Grammys for their album "Tanghetto plays Piazzolla", also the first time for the band to be nominated to both awards in the same calendar year.

References

External links

Interview to Tanghetto from tangopulse.net

Musical groups established in 2003
Musical groups from Buenos Aires
World music groups
Tango music groups
Electronic music groups
2001 establishments in Argentina